The Boxing Tournament at the 1978 Asian Games was held in Bangkok Recreation Center, Bangkok, Thailand from 10 to 18 December 1978.

South Korea finished first in medal table, winning five gold medals.

Medalists

Medal table

References
Amateur Boxing

External links
 OCA official website

 
1978 Asian Games events
1978
Asian Games
1978 Asian Games